Muar Municipal Council (abbreviated MPM) is a local authority which administrates Muar Town of Muar District, Johor, Malaysia. This agency is under Johor state government. MPM are responsible for public health and sanitation, waste removal and management, town planning, environmental protection and building control, social and economic development and general maintenance functions of urban infrastructure. The MPM main headquarters is located at Jalan Maharani, Bandar Maharani, Muar.

History 
 1903-1910 : Sanitary Board.
 1921 : Town Board; under Town Board Enactment 1911).
 06.03.1952 : Bandar Maharani Town Council (Majlis Bandaran Bandar Maharani); under Local Authorities Ordinance 1973).
 01.08.1976 : South Muar District Council (Majlis Daerah Muar Selatan); under Local Government Act, Temporary provisions (dibawah Akta Kerajaan Tempatan - peruntukan-peruntukan sementara 1973).
 01.01.2001 : Muar Municipal Council (Majlis Perbandaran Muar). This agency was granted municipal status in 2001.

President
Current President (Yang-di Pertua) of Muar Municipal Council:
Tuan Mustaffa Kamal Bin H. Shamsudin (since 01.01.2018)

See also

 Muar (town)
 Muar District
 MP Muar F.C.

References

External links

Municipal Council of Muar/Majlis Perbandaran Muar (MPM)

Muar District
Local government in Johor
1903 establishments in British Malaya
Municipal councils in Malaysia